"Front Lines (Hell on Earth)" is the official first single from Mobb Deep's Hell on Earth album. The song is listed on the album as "Hell on Earth (Front Lines)". The song samples "October Ballade" by Stanley Clarke, Chick Corea, Joe Henderson, Freddie Hubbard, and Lenny White.

The song is also included on the best of album Life of the Infamous: The Best of Mobb Deep.

Odd Future member Domo Genesis used the instrumental for his song "Benediction" from his 2011 mixtape Under the Influence.

Track listing
"Front Lines (Hell on Earth)" [LP Version]—(4:36)
"Front Lines (Hell on Earth)" [Instrumental]—(4:36)

Charts

1996 songs
Mobb Deep songs
Song recordings produced by Havoc (musician)
Songs written by Havoc (musician)
Songs written by Prodigy (rapper)